Aiani (before 1926: Καλλιανή - Kalliani) is a town and a former municipality in the Kozani regional unit, Macedonia, Greece. Since the 2011 local government reform it is part of the municipality Kozani, of which it is a municipal unit. The 2011 census recorded 2,006 residents in the village and 3,429 residents in municipal unit of Aiani. The municipal unit has an area of 156.004 km2, the community 52.336 km2.

Name
It took its name from the Aianus. According to the Greek mythology Aianus was the son of Elymus.

History
Aiani was the capital of Elimiotis, a kingdom and region of Upper Macedonia, which became part of Macedon.

Since 1983, systematic excavations in the area have brought to light finds that attest the existence of an organised city from the late 6th century BC to 100 BC. These are now housed in the Aiani Archaeological Museum. The excavations in the city of Aiani, brought to light the oldest pieces of matt-painted (black and white) pottery ever found. Some of the matt-painted pottery dates back to the 15th-14th century BC (Μycenaean era). Amongst the archaic pottery, some of the oldest samples of writing were found. Amongst them we have names inscribed like ΔΟΛΙΟ (DOLIO) and ΘΕΜΙΔΟΣ (THEMIDOS), which prove that the society of that region of Macedonia, spoke and wrote Greek before the 5th century BC. A single example of linear writing similar to that of southern Greece has been found, but its significance still remains unknown.

Communities
The municipal unit Aiani is subdivided into the following communities:
 Agia Paraskevi
 Aiani
 Chromio
 Kerasea
 Kteni
 Rodiani
 Rymnio

See also
List of settlements in the Kozani regional unit

References

External links
 Necropolis of Aiani -Britannica Video
 Photos of the Macedonian Historical place at Aiani

Mycenaean sites in Macedonia (Greece)
Former municipalities in Western Macedonia
Populated places in Kozani (regional unit)